The Forest Practices Board of British Columbia is an independent watchdog organization that advocates for sustainable forest and range practices in British Columbia, Canada. The agency investigates and publicizes issues concerning both government and the forest industry practices which affect forest health in the Province of British Columbia, Canada.

The Board carries out investigations and publicly reports  on the compliance of both forest-related industries and the British Columbia provincial government with provincial legislation as well as other special investigations and audits.  The organization also investigates complaints from the public concerning activities on Crown-owned land, and as a result may make recommendations and/or ask the government to review forestry operations approvals and law enforcement decisions.

References

External links 
www.bcfpb.ca
Environmental organizations based in British Columbia
Forestry agencies in Canada